Stanley Mann (August 8, 1928 – January 11, 2016) was a Canadian screenwriter. Born in Toronto, Ontario, he began his writing career in 1951 at CBC Radio, and was nominated for an Oscar for his work on the 1965 film The Collector, based on the John Fowles novel of the same title. He worked in many different genres, but his best known credits included the horror sequel Damien: Omen II, the literary adaptations A High Wind in Jamaica, Eye of the Needle and Firestarter, and the sword-and-sorcery film Conan the Destroyer. 

He was married to Florence Wood in the 1950s, while living and working in London, England. Following their divorce in 1959, Wood married novelist Mordecai Richler, who adopted Mann's son Daniel.

He died on January 11, 2016.

Partial filmography

The Butler's Night Off (1951 - co-screenplay)
Death of a Salesman  (1957) (television)
Another Time, Another Place  (1958)
The Mouse That Roared  (1959 - co-screenplay)
His and Hers  (1961 - co-screenplay)
The Mark  (1961 - co-screenplay)
Woman of Straw  (1964 - co-screenplay)
Up from the Beach  (1965 - co-screenplay)
The Collector  (1965 - co-screenplay)
A High Wind in Jamaica  (1965 - co-screenplay)
Rapture  (1965)
The Naked Runner  (1967)
The Strange Affair  (1968 - co-screenplay)
Fräulein Doktor (1969 - writer)
Theatre of Blood (1973-idea)
Russian Roulette  (1975 - co-screenplay)
Sky Riders  (1976 - co-screenplay)
Breaking Point  (1976 - co-screenplay)
Damien: Omen II  (1978 - co-screenplay)
Circle of Iron  (1978 - co-screenplay)
Meteor  (1979 - co-screenplay)
Eye of the Needle  (1981)
 Draw! (1984)
Firestarter  (1984)
Conan the Destroyer  (1984)
Tai-Pan  (1986 - co-screenplay)
Hanna's War  (1988 - co-screenplay)

Actor
Meteor  (1979) - Canadian Representative
Firestarter  (1984) - Motel Owner (Last appearance)

See also
His full credits are available on the IMDB website.

References

External links

1928 births
2016 deaths
20th-century Canadian dramatists and playwrights
20th-century Canadian screenwriters
Jewish Canadian writers
Writers from Toronto